The Shangri-La Hotel is a 43-floor hotel tower in Dubai, United Arab Emirates. The tower has a total structural height of 200 m. Construction of the Shangri-La Hotel was completed in July, 2003. It was built by South African construction firm Murray and Roberts, now renamed Concor.

See also 
 List of tallest buildings in Dubai
 List of tallest buildings in the United Arab Emirates
 List of tallest hotels in the world

References

External links
Shangri-La Hotel on Emporis
Shangri-la.com
Time line of Dubai'a skyscrapers.

Hotel buildings completed in 2003
Skyscraper hotels in Dubai
Shangri-La Hotels and Resorts